John Gianvito is a U.S. filmmaker, film curator, academic and movie critic.

Background
Gianvito attended the California Institute of the Arts where he earned a BFA, and the Massachusetts Institute of Technology, where he earned a MS.

He has worked as a curator with the Harvard Film Archive, and is currently an associate professor with the Department of Visual and Media Arts at Emerson College.

Filmography
A partial list of the films by John Gianvito:
 The Direct Approach (1978, short film)
 The Flower of Pain (1983)
 Address Unknown (1985, co-directed)
 What Nobody Saw (1990, short)
 The Mad Songs of Fernanda Hussein (2001)
 Puncture Wounds [September 11] (2002, short film)
 Profit Motive and the Whispering Wind (2007, short documentary)
 Vapor Trail (Clark) (2010)
 Far From Afghanistan (2012, co-directed, documentary)
 Wake (Subic) (2015, documentary)
 Her Socialist Smile (2020, documentary)

Published works

Further reading

References

External links
 
 

Living people
20th-century American writers
21st-century American writers
American film directors
American film producers
American male screenwriters
California Institute of the Arts alumni
Massachusetts Institute of Technology alumni
Emerson College faculty
Year of birth missing (living people)